Boletus vinaceobasis is a species of bolete fungus in the family Boletaceae. Found in North America, it was described as new to science in 1971 by Alexander H. Smith and Harry Delbert Thiers.

See also
 List of Boletus species

References

vinaceobasis
Fungi described in 1971
Fungi of North America